It's You may refer to:

Albums
 It's You (album), by Lee Konitz, 1996
 It's You, by Umphrey's McGee, 2018

Songs 
 "It's You" (Ali Gatie song), 2019
 "It's You" (Duck Sauce song), 2013
 "It's You" (Freddie Starr song), 1974
 "It's You" (Love Psychedelico song), 2011
 "It's You" (Super Junior song), 2009
 "It's You" (Zayn song), 2016
 "It's You", by Alma Cogan, 1964
 "It's You", by Black Motion featuring Miss P, 2015
 "It's You", by Bob Seger from Like a Rock, 1986
 "It's You", by the Coral from Distance Inbetween, 2016
 "It's You", by David Gates from Take Me Now, 1981
 "It's You", or "It's You That Leaves Me Dry", by EMF from Stigma, 1992
 "It's You", by Fireflight from The Healing of Harms, 2006
 "It's You", by Girls' Generation from Holiday Night, 2017
 "It's You", by Lala Karmela
 "It's You", by Michelle Branch from Hotel Paper, 2003
 "It's You", by Molly Kate Kestner, 2017
 "It's You", by Simply Red from Home, 2003
 "It's You", by the Specials from Guilty 'til Proved Innocent!, 1998
 "It's You", by Stevie Wonder from The Woman in Red, 1984
 "It's You", by Sung Si-kyung, 2010
 "It's You", by Taemin from Famous, 2019
 "It's You", by Talk Talk from It's My Life, 1984
 "It's You", by Urban Mystic, 2005
 "It's You", by Westlife from Back Home, 2007

Other uses 
 "It's You" (BoJack Horseman), a 2016 television episode
 It's You, a 2015 novel by Jane Porter